The 1998–99 season was Manchester City's first season in the third tier of English football.

The club was able to make an immediate return to Division One, thanks to a play-off final victory over Gillingham in a penalty shootout, having scored two goals in added time to turn around a 2–0 scoreline with 89 minutes of normal time played. The dramatic victory ensured that City's first season in English football's third tier ended in promotion, bringing some success to the club after two relegations in three seasons.

Team kit
The team kit was produced by Kappa and the shirt sponsor was Brother.

The home shirt for the season was a slightly darker shade of blue than the traditional City sky blue known as 'Laser Blue'. While the home shirt was generally well received, it was the away kit that would take on a special significance to Manchester City fans. While the luminous yellow and navy blue stripes were peculiar, with the yellow in particular somewhat garish and never having even been worn before by City, the shirt took on a whole new meaning when it was worn for the 1999 Football League Second Division play-off Final. Although this game technically marked the lowest ever league finish in Manchester City's history, instead the incredible circumstances by which City were able to win - having conceded the first two goals of the game in the last ten minutes of normal time, before getting two goals of their own in injury time, and then winning a penalty shoot-out - in fact mark this game as one of the proudest moments of the club's history. 

As a result, the kit instantly went from being an average if slightly unusual shirt to being one of the most iconic symbols of the club's history. There have been frequent if uncoordinated calls for the shirt to be brought back as an away kit in future seasons, though as yet the design has largely been forgotten by the club's successive kit manufacturers.

Season summary
City's first-ever season in the third tier got off to a bright start, with the team losing only one of their first six matches and topping the table after a victory over fellow third tier newcomers Macclesfield Town. After that, however, City would only win three more league matches before Christmas, as the heavily overhauled squad struggled to come together, with injuries only compounding the situation. The club would hit its lowest ebb after an embarrassing 2–1 loss to York City in their final pre-Christmas fixture, a result which left them 13th in the table and led to fans calling for Royle's sacking.

The board kept faith with Royle, however, and were rewarded with only two more losses all season, with the highlights of the season's second half being a 3–0 win against league leaders Fulham, a 6–0 away win over Burnley, and a 4–0 win over Lincoln City, who had beaten City earlier in the season. City's poor first half of the season, combined with the form of runaway leaders Fulham and second-placed Walsall meant that an automatic promotion challenge was never seriously on the cards, but they secured third place on the final day of the season, and also exacted revenge on York City for their earlier humiliation by thrashing the Minstermen 4–0, condemning them to relegation.

City faced off against Lancashire rivals Wigan Athletic in the first round of the play-offs, and a pair of tense matches ended with a 1–1 draw in the last competitive fixture at Wigan's Springfield Park ground, followed by a 1–0 victory at Maine Road, setting the stage for a Wembley Stadium showdown with Gillingham.

The play-off final was goalless for 82 minutes, before the Gills struck a pair of late goals that looked to have ensured that City would be spending a second successive season in Division Two. However, City themselves then scored a dramatic pair of injury-time goals (the second of which came in the 95th minute) to take the match to extra time. No further goals resulted in the next half-hour, leading to a penalty shoot-out. The Gills were able to convert only one of their penalties, while City scored three, ensuring that they returned to Division One at the first time of asking.

In the FA Cup, City beat Halifax Town first, then Darlington in a replay with an extra time winner, before losing to Wimbledon by a single goal. In the League Cup, City played very well against Notts County and won the second leg 7–1, but in the next round Derby County eliminated City by a single goal at Maine Road after a draw in the first leg.

Competitions

Second Division

League table

Results summary

Matches

Playoffs

Semi-finals

Final

FA Cup

Matches

League Cup

First round

Second round

Squad

Goalkeepers
  Nicky Weaver
  Tommy Wright

Defenders
  Lee Crooks
  Richard Edghill
  Nick Fenton
  Richard Jobson
  Andy Morrison
  Murtaz Shelia
  Danny Tiatto
  Kakhaber Tskhadadze
  Tony Vaughan
  Gerard Wiekens

Midfielders
  Ian Bishop
  Michael Brown
  Terry Cooke
  Neil Heaney
  Gary Mason
  Jamie Pollock
  Jeff Whitley
  Jim Whitley
  Kevin Horlock

Attackers
  Daniel Allsopp
  Lee Bradbury
  Michael Branch
  Paul Dickov
  Shaun Goater
  Chris Greenacre
  Mark Robins
  Craig Russell

References

External links

Manchester City F.C. seasons
Manchester City